Jamie Reeves (born 5 March 1953) is a regular football pundit on ESPN STAR Sports coverage of the English Premier League. He was formerly a semi-professional football player in England's Southern League, Isthmian League and Essex Senior League, and won the FA Vase twice (in 1979 and 1984). He then moved to Singapore where he played in the FAS Premier League, before becoming a television pundit.

Biography

Born in Essex, United Kingdom, Jamie attended the Westcliff High School for Boys, where he developed an interest in both Cricket and Rugby. He received a bachelor's degree in Economics at the University of Leicester in 1973, and a master's degree in Quantitative Social Science from the University of Kent at Canterbury in 1975.

After his graduation, he switched to soccer at the age of 22. He was soon spotted by his local semi-professional team and quickly moved through the ranks of non-league soccer, culminating in a winning appearance (4-1) at Wembley Stadium in 1979 for Billericay Town in the FA Vase. Five years later he reappeared at the same venue in the same competition, this time winning 3–2 with Stansted in what The Times described as "the biggest upset in FA Vase history".

After 13 years playing semi-professionally in the Southern League, Isthmian League and Essex Senior League, Jamie hung up his boots and within a year moved to Singapore. He briefly came out of retirement for one season in the FAS Premier League (the forerunner of the S.League), playing for the now-defunct team  Tyrwhitt Soccerites. He established a reputation for scoring with headers, and at the end of the season was named the league's second best player of the year by The Straits Times.

First appearing on TV in May 1992, working in the studio on the FA Cup Final between Liverpool and Sunderland, Jamie went on to do commentary work on the Malaysia Cup and the S.League before joining ESPN Star Sports. There, he has commentated on the Chinese Super League, the K-League, the UEFA Champions League, the Asian Games, the Asian World Cup Qualifiers and the Tiger Cup, as well as dabbling in La Liga and Serie A. He first worked as a studio pundit on the Premier League in the 2000-2001 season, and has been heavily involved with commenting on that league ever since.

Since 1989, he has also worked as an Economics teacher in Singapore. He is currently the Programme Head for the Humanities Programme at Raffles Institution.

Reeves is married with two children.

Honours

Billericay Town
 FA Vase: 1979

Stansted FC
 FA Vase: 1984

External links
 
 

Stansted F.C. players
Billericay Town F.C. players
Chelmsford City F.C. players
Alumni of the University of Leicester
Alumni of the University of Kent
1953 births
Living people
English footballers
Sportspeople from Essex
English expatriate footballers
Expatriate footballers in Singapore
English expatriates in Singapore
Association football forwards